The 1886 Vermont gubernatorial election took place on September 7, 1886. Incumbent Republican Samuel E. Pingree, per the "Mountain Rule", did not run for re-election to a second term as Governor of Vermont. Republican candidate Ebenezer J. Ormsbee defeated Democratic candidate Stephen C. Shurtleff to succeed him.

Results

References

Vermont
1886
Gubernatorial
September 1886 events